Herbert James Brearley was an English professional footballer who played as a winger for Burnley. He played two matches during the 1898–99 season.

References

Year of birth missing
Year of death missing
English footballers
Association football midfielders
Burnley F.C. players
English Football League players